The Mendocino National Forest is located in the Coastal Mountain Range in northwestern California and comprises 913,306 acres (3,696 km2). It is the only national forest in the state of California without a major paved road entering it.
There are a variety of recreational opportunities — camping, hiking, mountain biking, paragliding, backpacking, boating, fishing, hunting, nature study, photography, and off-highway vehicle travel.

The forest lies in parts of six counties. In descending order of forestland area they are Lake, Glenn, Mendocino, Tehama, Trinity, and Colusa counties.  Forest headquarters are located in Willows, California. There are local ranger district offices in Covelo, Upper Lake, and Stonyford.

Wilderness areas 

The forest includes four wilderness areas:
 Sanhedrin Wilderness - 
 Snow Mountain Wilderness — 
 Yolla Bolly-Middle Eel Wilderness —  (partly in Trinity NF, Six Rivers NF, or on BLM land)
 Yuki Wilderness -  (partly on BLM land)

The Sanhedrin and Yuki wildernesses were signed into law on October 17, 2006. This legislation, entitled "Northern California Coastal Wild Heritage Wilderness Act", added areas to both the Yolla Bolly - Middle Eel Wilderness and Snow Mountain Wilderness, and established the two new wilderness areas in the Mendocino National Forest.

Rivers, lakes, and hot springs 

Rivers include: Eel River, Rice Fork Eel River, Middle Fork Eel River, Black Butte River, and Stony Creek (Sacramento River).

 

Other lakes include Plaskett Lakes in the middle of the forest, Howard, Hammerhorn, Square and Long Lakes near Yolla Bolly-Middle Eel Wilderness in the northern portion.

History 
In 1905 the first surveys of public domain lands were conducted by Professor Lachie of the University of California, Berkeley, working under the direction of Gifford Pinchot, Chief of the United States Forest Service, to determine what land should be included in a forest reserve.
In 1905 the U.S. Congress moved the reserves from the General Land Office in the Department of the Interior to the new Division of Forestry in the Department of Agriculture. The Division of Forestry became the U.S. Forest Service.

President Theodore Roosevelt set aside the reserve (as authorized by the Forest Reserve Act of 1891) on February 6, 1907, as the Stony Creek Forest Reserve and one month later, the reserve was added to the national forest system as the Stony Creek National Forest.
 
Because of the difficulty of managing such a large tract of land, the northern portion was reassigned to Trinity National Forest, then the final boundaries of the new Stony Creek forest were drawn and was signed into law by executive order of the president on July 2, 1908, and renamed the California National Forest.

Yet another name

"In order to avoid the confusion growing out of the state and a national forest therein having the same name" President Herbert Hoover signed executive order 5885 renaming California National Forest to Mendocino National Forest on July 12, 1932.

The development of the forest increased to 81 offices, lookouts and guard stations until improvements in transportation and communications allowed some offices to be closed.
Today there are three ranger districts, with some of the former guard stations now being utilized as "work centers" that are primarily staffed by fire crews.
Two areas managed by the Mendocino National Forest are outside the contiguous boundaries and they are the Genetic Research Center in Chico, California, and the Lake Red Bluff Recreation Area in central California.

Genetic Research Center

Acquired by the Forest Service in 1974, it was originally a plant breeding research and plant introduction facility that was started in 1904 on a  site under the Agriculture Research Service. The center's research gradually changed to developing and producing genetically improved plant material for the reforestation program of the Pacific Southwest Region. Major work is done in the areas of biological, chemical, and clinical research on anti-cancer drugs derived

Wildfires 
The infamous Rattlesnake Fire occurred here in 1953. One Forest Service employee and 14 volunteer firefighters perished. The circumstances of the tragedy resulted in major changes in firefighting strategy and training. The firefighters are memorialized at the Rattlesnake Fire Memorial overlooking Rattlesnake Canyon. Access to it can be found off of Forest Highway 7 on County Road 307/Alder Springs Road.

The Trough Fire burned almost  of the Mendocino National Forest in 2001 including land in the Snow Mountain Wilderness.

One firefighter was killed by falling debris near Lake Pillsbury on August 13. The burned area included the entire Snow Mountain Wilderness.

Originating as 38 separate fires started by lighting on August 16 and 17, 2020, the August Complex Fire became the largest wildfire in California history. The fire was primarily burning through the Mendocino National Forest, and grew to over 1,026,000 acres.

Wildlife

The tule elk is one of the largest land mammals native to California, with cows weighing up to 350 pounds, and the largest bulls weighing roughly 500 pounds. Hunted to near extinction during the state's gold rush era, the animals were reintroduced to the Lake Pillsbury Basin in the late 1970s by the California Department of Fish and Game, and the herd has steadily grown, numbering around 80 in 2007.

The elk live on the north shore of the lake at the bottom of Hull Mountain, and enjoy wild clovers and grasses, along with the green summer and fall foliage around Lake Pillsbury's edges. Mendocino National Forest and Los Padres National Forest are the only two national forests in California to have tule elk. There is a 10-day hunting season beginning on the second Wednesday in September each year.

Vegetation
An estimated  of old growth occur here, including forests of Coast Douglas-fir (Pseudotsuga menziesii var. menziesii), Ponderosa Pine (Pinus ponderosa), White Fir (Abies concolor), Tanoak (Lithocarpus densiflorus), and Pacific madrone (Arbutus menziesii).

Footnotes

External links 

 Official Mendocino National Forest website
 Mendocino National Forest: Tule Elk Management
 Mendocino National Forest: Letts Lake
 California Department of Fish & Game: Lake Pillsbury

 
National Forests of California
California Coast Ranges
Protected areas of Colusa County, California
Protected areas of Lake County, California
Protected areas of Glenn County, California
Protected areas of Mendocino County, California
Protected areas of Tehama County, California
Protected areas of Trinity County, California
Willows, California
Protected areas established in 1907
1907 establishments in California